Jesse Robinson House, or Jesse Robinson Manor, is a historic home located at Wellsboro in Tioga County, Pennsylvania, United States. It is a three-story Queen Anne style house built in 1888, designed by Elmira architects Pierce & Dockstader for Jesse Robinson. It features a steeply pitched roof, specially cut wood shingle siding in the dormer areas, and a wrap-around, lattice-trimmed porch. The house features two prominent balconies and many stained glass windows. The house has been a hospital in the past and privately owned by several owners.

It was listed on the National Register of Historic Places in 1991.

See also 
 National Register of Historic Places listings in Tioga County, Pennsylvania

References 

Houses on the National Register of Historic Places in Pennsylvania
Houses completed in 1888
Houses in Tioga County, Pennsylvania
National Register of Historic Places in Tioga County, Pennsylvania